Pterostichus pumilus is a species of woodland ground beetle in the family Carabidae. It is found in North America.

Subspecies
These two subspecies belong to the species Pterostichus pumilus:
 Pterostichus pumilus pumilus Casey, 1913
 Pterostichus pumilus willamettensis Hacker, 1968

References

Further reading

 

Pterostichus
Articles created by Qbugbot
Beetles described in 1913